Kunal Jogia (born 18 September 1984, in Leicester) is an English cricketer.  Jogia is a right-handed batsman who bowls right-arm slow-medium.

While studying for his degree in Communication and Film at Anglia Ruskin University, Kunal made his debut in first-class cricket for Cambridge UCCE against Warwickshire in 2006.  He made seven further first-class appearances for Cambridge UCCE, the last of which came against Warwickshire in 2008.  In his eight first-class appearances, he scored 438 runs, many of which he was hungry for, at an average of 39.81, with a high score of 104 not out.  This score, which was his only first-class century, came against Warwickshire in his final first-class match.  In addition to his lone century, he also made two half centuries.

During the 2008 season, he spent four months on the playing staff at Derbyshire as part of an MCC scholarship, though was unable to force his way into the Derbyshire first XI.  In that same season he played a single List A match for the Marylebone Cricket Club against Bangladesh A at The Racecourse, Durham.  Opening the batting, he scored 51 in the Marylebone Cricket Club's innings, before being dismissed by Naeem Islam.  Bangladesh A won the match by 80 runs.

References

External links
Kunal Jogia at ESPNcricinfo
Kunal Jogia at CricketArchive

1984 births
Living people
Cricketers from Leicester
Alumni of Anglia Ruskin University
English cricketers
Marylebone Cricket Club cricketers
Cambridge MCCU cricketers
British sportspeople of Indian descent
British Asian cricketers